Diaphus parri, the Parr's lanternfish, is a species of lanternfish 
found worldwide.

Size

Etymology
The fish is named in honor of marine biologist Albert Eide Parr (1900–1991), because of his contribution to lanternfish taxonomy

References

Myctophidae
Taxa named by Åge Vedel Tåning
Fish described in 1932